Chambly—Rouville  was a federal electoral district in Quebec, Canada, that was represented in the House of Commons of Canada from 1935 to 1968.

This riding was created in 1933 from parts of Chambly—Verchères and St. Hyacinthe—Rouville ridings.  It was abolished into Chambly and Saint-Hyacinthe in 1966.

History

It initially consisted of:
 the county of Chambly, including the cities of Longueuil and St-Lambert;
 the county of Rouville excepting such part thereof as is included in the municipalities of St-Paul-d'Abbotsford, St-Ange-Gardien, St-Césaire, and the villages of Canrobert and St-Césaire;
 that part of the county of Verchères included in the municipality of the town of Beloeil, the village of McMasterville, and the municipalities of Ste-Julie and St-Mathieu.

In 1947, it was redefined to consist of: 
 the county of Chambly (except the municipality of Ste. Famille-de-Boucherville and the village of Boucherville), the cities of Longueuil and St. Lambert and the towns of Greenfield Park and Montreal South;
 the county of Rouville (except that part of the county included in the municipalities of St. Paul-d'Abbotsford, St. Ange-Gardien, St. Césaire and the villages of Canrobert and St. Césaire), and the town of Marieville;
 the town of Beloeil and that part of the county of Verchères included in the village of McMasterville and the municipalities of Ste. Julie and St. Mathieu.

In 1952, it was defined to consist of: 
 the county of Chambly, (less the municipality of the parish of Sainte-Famille-de-Boucherville, and the municipality of the village of Boucherville);
 the town of Fort Chambly;
 the county of Rouville, (less the parish municipalities of Saint-Paul-d'Abbotsford, and Saint-Ange-Gardien, the municipality of Saint-Césaire, and the village municipalities of Canrobert and Saint-Césaire);
 the town of Marieville;  the town of Beloeil and that part of the county of Verchères included in the village municipality of McMasterville and the parish municipalities of Sainte-Julie and Saint-Mathieu-de-Beloeil.

Members of Parliament

This riding elected the following Members of Parliament:

Election results

See also 

 List of Canadian federal electoral districts
 Past Canadian electoral districts

External links
Riding history from the Library of Parliament

Former federal electoral districts of Quebec